The 2021 FIFA Beach Soccer World Cup was an international beach soccer tournament held in Russia from 19 to 29 August 2021. The 16 national teams involved in the tournament were required by FIFA to register a squad of 14 players, including three goalkeepers. This article lists the national beach soccer squads that will take part in the tournament. Only the players listed in these squads below are eligible to take part in the tournament which were revealed in full on 13 August 2021.

The age listed for each player is as on 19 August 2021, the first day of the tournament and the names of the players shown are, in most circumstances, that of the FIFA Display Names listed on the official squad document issued by FIFA.

Group A

RFU
Coach: 	Mikhail Likhachev

United States
Coach: Francis Farberoff

The final squad was announced on 11 August 2021.

Paraguay
Coach: Joaquin Molas

Japan
Coach: Ozu Moreira (interim)

The final squad was announced on 26 July 2021.

On 15 August, Ryunosuke Miyama replaced the injured Kosuke Matsuda.

Group B

Mozambique
Coach: Abineiro Ussaca

Spain
Coach: Cristian Mendez

Tahiti
Coach: Teva Zaveroni

United Arab Emirates
Coach: Mohamed Bashir

Group C

Belarus
Coach:  Nicolás Caporale

Brazil
Coach: Gilberto Costa

El Salvador
Coach: Rudis González

Switzerland
Coach: Angelo Schirinzi

Group D

Oman
Coach: Talib Al Thanawi

Portugal
Coach: Mário Narciso

Senegal
Coach: Oumar Sylla

Uruguay
Coach: German Parrillo

Statistics
Overall, 224 players have travelled to Russia to compete in the tournament. The average age of all players is 29.9 years.

Fifteen of the sixteen managers are managing their own nation's national team whilst just one manages a foreign team in respect to their own nationality.

Youngest v oldest player

Average age of squads

Players by age category

See also
2021 FIFA Futsal World Cup squads

References

External links
FIFA Beach Soccer World Cup, FIFA.com

Squads
Beach soccer tournament squads